The Chūseikai (lit. Impartiality Society) was a political party in Japan.

History
The party was established in December 1913 as a merger of Ekirakukai and Seiyū Club and initially had 37 MPs. It supported Ōkuma Shigenobu's government from 1914 until 1916, with party member Yukio Ozaki appointed Minister of Justice. In the 1915 general elections it won 33 seats, and in October 1916 it merged into the new Kenseikai party.

References

Defunct political parties in Japan
Political parties established in 1913
1913 establishments in Japan
Political parties disestablished in 1916
1916 disestablishments in Japan